The Trade Disputes And Trade Unions Act 1946 (9 & 10 Geo. VI c. 52) was a British Act of Parliament passed by post-war Labour government to repeal the Trade Disputes and Trade Unions Act 1927.

Repeal
The Act was repealed by the Schedule 1 of the Trade Union and Labour Relations (Consolidation) Act 1992.

See also
Amalgamated Society of Railway Servants v Osborne [1910] AC 87
Trade Union Act 1913
Trade Disputes and Trade Unions Act 1927
TULRCA 1992 s 82

External links
 Act as passed from the British and Irish Legal Information Institute

References

United Kingdom Acts of Parliament 1946
Trade union legislation
1946 in labor relations
United Kingdom labour law